The Donbas Operation (September 29 – November 4, 1941) was a frontline defensive operation of the Soviet Red Army in the territory of Donbas on the Eastern Front of the Second World War in Europe. It was an integral part of the Donbas–Rostov Strategic Defensive Operation.

Forces of the parties
By the end of September 1941, the German army’s approaches to Donbas were defended by:
Southwestern Front (Marshal of the Soviet Union Semyon Timoshenko):
6th Army.
Southern Front (Lieutenant General Dmitry Ryabyshev, from October 5, Colonel General Yakov Cherevichenko):
12th Army (Soviet Union) (Major General Ivan Galanin);
18th Army (Soviet Union) (Lieutenant General Andrey Smirnov);
9th Army (Soviet Union) (Lieutenant General Fedor Kharitonov).

The advancing forces consisted of the troops of Army Group South:
17th Army (Stülpnagel);
1st Panzer Group (Kleist);
Part of the 11th Army (Manstein);
Main forces of the 3rd Romanian Army.

The superiority of German troops over the Soviets was:
In manpower and aviation – 2 times;
In guns and mortars – 3 times.

Operation
On September 29, German forces launched an offensive. The 1st Panzer Group (from October 6, the 1st Tank Army) and the motorized division of the 11th Army almost immediately broke through the defenses of the Soviet troops and entered the area of the city of Osipenko (now Berdyansk). With this maneuver, they surrounded parts of the 18th and 9th Armies. The encirclement continued until October 10.

The Soviet 12th Army took up defenses on the Pavlograd (Pavlohrad)–Vasilkovka (Vasylkivka)–Gavrilovka (Havrylivka) line to contain the enemy's advance and ensure the withdrawal of the remaining troops.

At the same time, the Soviet Taganrog Combat Area was created, consisting of 3 rifle divisions to organize defense on the eastern bank of the Mius River from Uspenskaya (Uspenka[?]) to Taganrog and to cover the approaches to Rostov-on-Don.

On October 14, the Soviet 9th Army and the Taganrog Combat Area (the troops of the Southern Front) launched a counterattack and pushed the enemy forward units by 10–15 kilometers. However, with the approach of the main forces of the 1st German Tank Army, Soviet troops were again forced to retreat. The right wing of the front, by order of the Headquarters of the Supreme High Command, retreated to the Krasny Liman (Lyman)–Debaltsevo (Debaltseve) line, and the left wing (18th and 9th Armies), under pressure from superior German forces, to the Debaltsevo–Krasnyi Luch–Bolshekrepinskaya–Khapry line, where they took up defensive positions.

Outcome
German and Romanian forces defeated the remnants of the Southern Front of the Red Army, reached the Sea of Azov and entered the Crimea, and occupied the southwestern part of Donbas.

In early November, the 1st Panzer Group of the Wehrmacht resumed the offensive on Rostov-on-Don (Rostov Defensive Operation).

Notes

References

Sources

History of Donetsk Oblast
History of Luhansk Oblast
1941 in Ukraine
Conflicts in 1941
September 1941 events
October 1941 events
November 1941 events